A sound board, or soundboard, is the surface of a string instrument that the strings vibrate against, usually via some sort of bridge. Pianos, guitars, banjos, and many other stringed instruments incorporate soundboards. The resonant properties of the sound board and the interior of the instrument greatly increase the loudness of the vibrating strings. "The soundboard is probably the most important element of a guitar in terms of its influence on the quality of the instrument's tone ."

The sound board operates by the principle of forced vibration. The string gently vibrates the board, and despite their differences in size and composition, makes the board vibrate at exactly the same frequency. This produces the same sound as the string alone, differing only in timbre. The string would produce the same amount of energy without the board present, but the greater surface area of the sound board moves a greater volume of air, which produces a louder sound. "Generally, stiffer boards will give a brighter edge to the sound than softer, more flexible boards....A good, dry sound board has a certain 'live' tone while a poor one will have a relatively dead response," which may be tested during construction by thumping the board and listening for, "brighter, more noticeable ring[ing]," as one works the board, "to the appropriate thinness."

Sound boards are traditionally made of wood (see tonewood), though other materials are used, such as skin or plastic on instruments in the banjo family. Wooden sound boards typically have one or more sound holes of various shapes. Round, oval, or F-holes appear on many plucked instruments, such as  guitars and mandolins. F-holes are usual in violin family instruments. Lutes commonly have elaborate rosettes.

The sound board, depending on the instrument, is called a top plate, table, sound-table, or belly. It is usually made of a softwood, often spruce.

In a grand piano, the sound board is part of the case. In an upright piano, the sound board is a large vertical plate at the back of the instrument. The harp has a sound board below the strings.

More generally, any hard surface can act as a sound board. An example is when someone strikes a tuning fork and holds it against a table top to amplify its sound.

See also
Piano acoustics

References

String instrument construction
Guitar parts and accessories

ca:Caixa de ressonància